The Lebanese First Division, commonly known as the Lebanese Premier League, is the top division of the Lebanese football league system. There are 12 teams competing in the league, which operates on a system of promotion and relegation with the Lebanese Second Division.

The league's first season began in May 1934, with Nahda winning the first title. The most successful club in the league is Ansar, with 14 league titles; they set a Guinness World Record by winning 11 consecutive league titles between 1988 and 1999. Seasons run from September to June with each team playing 21 games per season. Most games are played on weekend afternoons.

History

On 22 March 1933, representatives of 13 football clubs gathered in the Minet El Hosn district in Beirut to form the Lebanese Football Association (LFA). The Lebanese Premier League began in May 1934 as the Edmond Rubeiz Cup, in honour of Nahda player Edmon Rubeiz who died of typhoid the previous year. The competition was held in a knockout format, with Nahda beating DPHB 7–1 in the final to win the inaugural competition.

Nahda, AUB, and DPHB shared the titles during the first decade of the league. Between the 1940s and 1960s Armenian clubs, mainly Homenetmen and Homenmen, were the most prominent in the Lebanese footballing scene. The two clubs shared 11 titles in 16 seasons between 1943 and 1969. Following a 12-year interruption of the league due to the Lebanese Civil War, Ansar dominated the league winning 11 consecutive league titles between 1988 and 1999. They set a Guinness World Record for most consecutive league titles, which has been since broken by Skonto of Latvia in 2002.

From 2000, Nejmeh were the dominating force in Lebanon, winning five out of nine league titles until 2009. In 2008, Ahed won their first league title; they have won the league eight times since. After winning the league in 2018–19, Ahed became the three-time defending champions, a feat accomplished only one other time, by Ansar in 1992. Due to financial and political issues in the country, as well as the COVID-19 pandemic, the LFA decided to cancel the ongoing 2019–20 season.

Competition format

Competition
There are 12 clubs in the Lebanese Premier League. Prior to the 2020–21 season, each club played the others twice (a double round-robin system), once at their home stadium and once at that of their opponents', for 22 games.

Starting from the 2020–21 season, the league has operated on a "split" system. A season is divided in two phases: in the first phase, each club plays each other once for a total of 11 matchdays. After the first phase, the league splits into two halves – a "top six" section and a "bottom six" section. Each club plays a further five matches (once against each club in its own section). Points achieved during the first phase are carried over into the second phase. From the 2022–23 season onwards, the points carried over are halved. The system has been viewed positively by various members of Lebanese football.

Teams receive three points for a win and one point for a draw. No points are awarded for a loss.

Teams are ranked by total points; in case two teams are par on points, the following rules for classification apply:
 Head-to-head points;
 Goal difference;
 Goals scored;
 Decisive match; in case of a draw, a penalty-shootout will determine the winner.

If more than two teams are par on points:
 Head-to-head points of the concerned clubs;
 Goal difference in the direct confrontation games;
 Goal difference in the league;
 Goals scored in the league;
 Mini-league between the involved teams, which play each other once.

Promotion and relegation
A system of promotion and relegation exists between the Lebanese Premier League and the Lebanese Second Division since 1935. In April 1935, Second Division clubs requested a promotion system to be implemented. It was proposed that, at the end of the season, every Second Division team that wanted to be promoted to the First Division had to play against three teams from the First Division, winning all three. The teams from the First Division had to have at least 7 players from their squad in the previous season.

The two lowest placed teams in the Lebanese Premier League are relegated to the Second Division, and the top two teams from the Second Division promoted to the Lebanese Premier League.

Clubs

Champions

2022–23 season
The following 12 clubs will compete in the Lebanese Premier League during the 2022–23 season.

Media coverage
Broadcasting rights for the Lebanese Premier League were distributed to MTV Lebanon starting from the 2016–17 season, on a five-year contract worth $600,000 per season; the contract was renewed in 2022 for a further four seasons. Live coverage of three games is broadcast each week, and weekly highlights of each match are produced once a week. The LFA broadcast the other weekly games on its YouTube channel between 2020 and 2022.

In October 2022, the LFA and FIFA signed an agreement to show all matches in the Lebanese Second Division, Lebanese Super Cup and Lebanese Women's Football League through the FIFA+ platform; FIFA+ also replaced the LFA YouTube channel in transmitting the remaining Lebanese Premier League games not covered by MTV.

Stadiums

At the start of the 2005–06 season, the Lebanese government imposed a ban on spectators due to fears of political and sectarian-inspired violence in the stadiums. After six years, in 2011, the ban was lifted and fans were allowed to regularly attend matches. While attendance was initially scarce, spectators started to show up more regularly season after season. Indeed, in 2018 ultras groups started to form, with Nejmeh's "Ultras Supernova" being the first. Other teams quickly followed, such as Ansar, Ahed and Bourj.

Prior to the start of each season, every team chooses two stadiums as their home venues. In case both stadiums are unavailable for a certain matchday, another venue is used. While teams such as Nejmeh and Ahed have their own stadiums, respectively Rafic Hariri Stadium and Ahed Stadium, they prefer to use bigger stadiums in Lebanon such as the Camille Chamoun Sports City Stadium and the Beirut Municipal Stadium.

Players

Foreign players and transfer regulations
Lebanese clubs are allowed to have three foreign players at their disposal at any time, as well as two extra Palestinian players born in Lebanon in a given match sheet (both of whom can not be fielded at the same time in a match). Moreover, each club competing in an AFC competition is allowed to field one extra foreign player, to be only played in continental matches, as the AFC allows four foreign players to play in the starting eleven (one of whom from an AFC country). Starting from the 1998–99 season, the Lebanese Football Association has prevented the acquisition of foreign goalkeepers.

Players may only be transferred during transfer windows that are set by the Lebanese Football Association. The two transfer windows run from 20 June to 23 August and from 21 November to 20 December. Due to the economic situation in Lebanon, clubs were barred from fielding foreign players in the league in 2020–21 and the first half of 2021–22.

Homegrown players
Starting from the 2019–20 season, all teams in the Lebanese Premier League and Lebanese Second Division must involve a certain number of under-22 players in both the league and the Lebanese FA Cup, with a minimum of 1,000 minutes for one player, a minimum of 1,500 aggregate minutes for two players and a minimum of 2,000 aggregate minutes for three players. In case a club were to not meet the required number of minutes at the end of the season, they would have three points deducted from their total in the league.

As the 2019–20 season was cancelled, the player quota was ultimately implemented for the 2020–21 season, with a few amendments. Each club must involve one player for at least 600 minutes, two players for at least 800 combined minutes, and three players for at least 1,200 combined minutes. Also, each club is allowed a maximum of eight players over the age of 30, with only five being able to be fielded in a game. In the 2022–23 season, the quotas changed to 2,000 combined minutes for two under-21 players and 3,000 combined minuted for three players.

Top scorers

Italics denotes players still playing football,Bold denotes players still playing in the Lebanese Premier League.

The Golden Boot is awarded to the top Lebanese Premier League scorer at the end of each season. Fadi Alloush holds the record for most Lebanese Premier League goals with 120. Seven players were top scorers more than once: Levon Altounian, Fadi Alloush, Mohammad Kassas, Mohammed Ghaddar, Lucas Galán, Elhadji Malick Tall and Hassan Maatouk have all been top scorers twice. Fadi Alloush holds the record for most goals in a season (32) while playing for Ansar.

Official match ball
On 30 July 2019, the Lebanese Football Association announced a three-year deal with German sportswear company Jako for €120,000, with the Jako Match 2.0 becoming the league's official match ball starting from the 2019–20 season.

 2019–2020: Jako Match 2.0
 2020–present: Jako Galaxy Match 2.0

See also
 Football in Lebanon
 Lebanese football league system
 Lebanese Women's Football League
 Lebanon national football team
 Al-Manar Football Festival
 List of top-division football clubs in AFC countries

Notes and references

Notes

References

Bibliography

External links

  
 Lebanese Premier League at MTV Lebanon 
 Lebanese Premier League at Kooora 
 Lebanese Premier League at Soccerway

 
1
1934 establishments in Lebanon
Sports leagues in Lebanon
Sports leagues established in 1934
Lebanon